Camp David (stylised as CAMP DAVID) is a fashion label of Clinton Großhandels-GmbH founded in 1997 and headquartered in Hoppegarten, Brandenburg. The label produces men's clothing and manages retail stores. It focuses on leisurewear, but also offers suits, accessories, and shoes. Famous brand ambassadors include Dieter Bohlen, Arthur Abraham, and Marcus Schenkenberg.

History 

The label was developed in 1997 by the company Clinton as a brand of leisurewear for men. At the same time, the label Soccx targeted towards women was also created. In 2000, the franchise system Chelsea was created for the establishment of clothing stores. In 2008, a concept for Camp David stores and 2010 one for Soccx was introduced in the same way. Until 2010, the brand was only available in the new states of Germany. The expansion into the West only began following the hiring of Dieter Bohlen as a brand ambassador and the associated presence of the brand in the television programme Das Supertalent, the German instalment of the Got Talent franchise. In 2013, there were 230 stores and more than 1,000 selling areas in department store or boutiques of both Camp David and Soccx in Germany, Austria, and Switzerland. In 2014, according to data provided by the company, there were 250 stores and 1,500 selling areas. 

The mother company Clinton was named after Bill Clinton, who was President of the United States when it was founded, while Camp David was chosen after the country retreat for the President. Soccx references Bill Clinton's pet cat Socks and Chelsea his daughter Chelsea Clinton. The names are considered as a successful example of the country-of-origin effect.

References 

Clothing brands of Germany
Clothing companies established in 1997
Companies based in Brandenburg
1997 establishments in Germany